Marinirhabdus citrea is a Gram-negative, aerobic, rod-shaped and non-motile bacterium from the genus of Marinirhabdus which has been isolated from seaweed from Yeonggwang County.

References

Flavobacteria
Bacteria described in 2018